Family planning in Hong Kong occurs within a context of a total fertility rate in Hong Kong of currently 1.04 children per woman, one of the lowest in the world.

The Eugenics League was founded in 1936, which became The Family Planning Association of Hong Kong in 1950. The organisation provides family planning advice, sex education and birth control services to the general public. In the 1970s, due to the rapidly rising population, it launched the "Two is Enough" campaign, which reduced the general birth rate through educational means.

The Family Planning Association of Hong Kong was one of the eight family planning organisations that founded the International Planned Parenthood Federation.

See also
Demographics of Hong Kong
Two-child policy

References

External links
Family Health Service at the Department of Health

Health in Hong Kong
Hong Kong